Rajkumar Singh or Raj Kumar Singh may refer to:

Lal Pratap Singh (Rajkumar Lal Pratap Singh; died 1858), Indian independence activist
R. K. Singh (Raj Kumar Singh; born 1952), Member of the Lok Sabha, the lower house of the Parliament of India (from 2014)
Raj Kumar Dorendra Singh (1934–2018), Chief Minister of the Indian state of Manipur (1992–1993)
Raj Kumar Jaichandra Singh (born 1942), Chief Minister of the Indian state of Manipur (1988–1990)
Raj Kumar Ranbir Singh (died 2016), Chief Minister of the Indian state of Manipur (1990–1992)
Rajkumar Achouba Singh (born 1938), Indian Manipuri dancer (Raas and Lai Haraoba forms) and teacher
Rajkumar Jhalajit Singh (born 1924), Indian political activist, journalist, historian and educator
Rajkumar Shitaljit Singh (1913–2008), Indian writer, translator and educator
Rajkumar Singhajit Singh (born 1935), Indian Manipuri dancer (primarily Pung cholom and Raslila forms) and choreographer
Rajkumar Singh (cricketer) (born 2000), Indian cricketer

See also 
Raj Singh (disambiguation)
Rajkumari Singh (disambiguation)